The 2012–13 Petron Blaze Boosters season was the 38th season of the franchise in the Philippine Basketball Association (PBA). The team placed seventh in the Philippine Cup, third in the Commissioner's Cup and second in the Governors' Cup. It had three draft picks: two Filipino and one American.

Key dates
August 19: The 2012 PBA Draft was held in Robinson's Midtown Mall, Manila.
August 22: Ato Agustin was replaced as head coach by assistant coach Olsen Racela. Team consultant Rajko Toroman was made assistant coach, with a more active role anticipated.
October 24: Petron management gave full control of the team to Olsen Racela, with Toroman no longer active. Racela appointed Gee Abanilla as lead assistant coach.

Draft picks

Roster

Philippine Cup

Eliminations

Standings

Game log

|- bgcolor="#edbebf" 
| 1
|  October 3
|  Rain or Shine
|  86–102
|  Yeo, Santos (16)
|  Fajardo (12)
|  Lutz (5)
|  Smart Araneta Coliseum
|  0–1
|  Boxscore
|- bgcolor="#bbffbb" 
| 2
|  October 10
|  Barako Bull
|  98–89
|  Lutz (22)
|  Santos (11)
|  Cabagnot (10)
|  Smart Araneta Coliseum
|  1–1
|  Boxscore
|- bgcolor="#edbebf" 
| 3
|  October 14
|  San Mig Coffee
|  84–90
|  Santos (18)
|  Fajardo (13)
|  Lutz (6)
|  Smart Araneta Coliseum
|  1–2
|  Boxscore
|- bgcolor="#edbebf" 
| 4
|  October 19
|  Alaska
|  86–88
|  Lutz (20)
|  Washington (13)
|  Lutz, Cabagnot (6)
|  Smart Araneta Coliseum
|  1–3
|  Boxscore
|- bgcolor="#bbffbb" 
| 5
|  October 21
|  Barangay Ginebra
|  98–95
|  Cabagnot (25)
|  Santos (17)
|  Cabagnot (8)
|  Mall of Asia Arena
|  2–3
|  Boxscore
|- bgcolor="#bbffbb" 
| 6
|  October 26
|  GlobalPort
|  110–98
|  Santos (29)
|  Santos (17)
|  Cabagnot (9)
|  Smart Araneta Coliseum
|  3–3
|  Boxscore

|- bgcolor="#edbebf" 
| 7
|  November 2
|  Air21
|  76–97
|  Santos (15)
|  Santos (14)
|  Lutz (7)
|  Smart Araneta Coliseum
|  3–4
|  Boxscore
|- bgcolor="#edbebf"  
| 8
|  November 7
|  Talk 'N Text
|  82–92
|  Lutz (18)
|  Santos (11)
|  Santos (6)
|  Smart Araneta Coliseum
|  3–5
|  Boxscore
|- bgcolor="#edbebf" 
| 9
|  November 11
|  Meralco
|  81–95
|  Cabagnot (19)
|  Santos (16)
|  Cabagnot, Lutz (4)
|  Mall of Asia Arena
|  3–6
|  Boxscore
|- bgcolor="#bbffbb" 
| 10
|  November 14
|  Rain or Shine
|  96–86
|  Lutz (19)
|  Santos (15)
|  Cabagnot (7)
|  Smart Araneta Coliseum
|  4–6
|  Boxscore
|- bgcolor="#bbffbb" 
| 11
|  November 18
|  GlobalPort
|  110–81
|  Lutz (22)
|  Santos (13)
|  Miranda (10)
|  Smart Araneta Coliseum
|  5–6
|  Boxscore
|- bgcolor="#bbffbb" 
| 12
|  November 24
|  Barako Bull
|  93–83
|  Santos (21)
|  Santos (12)
|  Cabagnot, Lutz (5)
|  Lucena City
|  6–6
|  Boxscore
|- bgcolor="#edbebf" 
| 13
|  November 28
|  Talk 'N Text
|  82–95
|  Santos (22)
|  Santos (11)
|  Cabagnot, Miranda (4)
|  Smart Araneta Coliseum
|  6–7
|  Boxscore

|- bgcolor="#edbebf" 
| 14
|  December 5
|  Alaska
|  71–79
|  Lassiter (14)
|  Santos (11)
|  Yeo, Miranda, Lutz (3)
|  Smart Araneta Coliseum
|  6–8
|  Boxscore

Playoffs

Bracket

Game log

|- bgcolor="#edbebf" 
| 1
|  December 13
|  San Mig Coffee
|  87–92*
|  Fajardo (22)
|  Fajardo (15)
|  Cabagnot (10)
|  Smart Araneta Coliseum
|  0–1
|  Boxscore

Commissioner's Cup

Eliminations

Standings

Game log

|- bgcolor="#edbebf" 
| 1
|  February 8
|  GlobalPort
|  92–94
|  Balkman (23)
|  Balkman (14)
|  Cabagnot (8)
|  Smart Araneta Coliseum
|  0–1
|  boxscore
|- bgcolor="#bbffbb" 
| 2
|  February 13
|  San Mig Coffee
|  98–73
|  Balkman (28)
|  Balkman (15)
|  Cabagnot (6)
|  Smart Araneta Coliseum
|  1–1
|  boxscore
|- bgcolor="#bbffbb" 
| 3
|  February 17
|  Barangay Ginebra
|  105–90
|  Balkman (34)
|  Balkman (10)
|  Miranda, Cabagnot (6)
|  Smart Araneta Coliseum
|  2–1
|  boxscore
|- bgcolor="#bbffbb" 
| 4
|  February 20
|  Meralco
|  88–86
|  Balkman (26)
|  Fajardo (12)
|  Washington (5)
|  Smart Araneta Coliseum
|  3–1
|  boxscore

|- bgcolor="#bbffbb" 
| 5
|  March 1
|  Air21
|  60–53
|  Balkman (25)
|  Balkman (13)
|  Lanete (4)
|  Smart Araneta Coliseum
|  4–1
|  boxscore
|- bgcolor="#bbffbb" 
| 6
|  March 3
|  Barako Bull
|  91–78
|  Balkman (33)
|  Balkman (14)
|  Lanete (5)
|  Smart Araneta Coliseum
|  5–1
|  boxscore
|- bgcolor="#edbebf" 
| 7
|  March 8
|  Alaska
|  73–83
|  Miranda (25)
|  Balkman (17)
|  Miranda (5)
|  Smart Araneta Coliseum
|  5–2
|  boxscore
|- – bgcolor="#bbffbb" 
| 8
|  March 16
|  Rain or Shine
|  87–79
|  June Mar Fajardo
|  June Mar Fajardo
|  Alex Cabagnot
|  Panabo, Davao del Norte
|  6–2
|  
|- 
| 9
|  March 22
|  Talk 'N Text
|  
|  
|  
|  
|  Smart Araneta Coliseum
|  
|

Playoffs

Bracket

Governors' Cup

Eliminations

Standings

Game log

Playoffs

Bracket

Transactions

Trades

Pre-season

Commissioner's Cup

Recruited imports

References

San Miguel Beermen seasons
Petron